Chicago is a 1927 American silent crime comedy-drama film produced by Cecil B. DeMille and directed by Frank Urson. The first film adaptation of Maurine Dallas Watkins' play of the same name, the film stars Phyllis Haver as Roxie Hart, a fame-obsessed housewife who kills her lover in cold blood and, after trying to coerce her husband into taking the blame, is put on trial for murder.

Plot
The plot of the film is drawn from the 1926 play Chicago by Maurine Dallas Watkins which was in turn based on the true story of Beulah Annan, fictionalized as Roxie Hart (Phyllis Haver), and her spectacular murder of her boyfriend.

The silent film adds considerably to the material in Watkins' play, some additions based on the original murder, and some for Hollywood considerations. The murder, which occurs in a very brief vignette before the play begins, is fleshed out considerably. Also, Roxie's husband Amos Hart has a much more sympathetic and active role in the film than he does either in the play or in the subsequent musical. The original ending is altered to have Roxie punished for her crime, in keeping with Hollywood values of not allowing criminals to profit too much from their crimes.

Cast
 Phyllis Haver as Roxie Hart
 Victor Varconi as Amos Hart
 Virginia Bradford as Katie
 Robert Edeson as Billy Flynn
 Eugene Pallette as Rodney Casley
 Warner Richmond as Asst. District Attorney
 T. Roy Barnes as Reporter
 Clarence Burton as Police sergeant
 Julia Faye as Velma Kelly
 May Robson as Matron Mama Morton
 Viola Louie as Two Gun Rosie

Preservation status
The film was long difficult to see, but a recent print was made available from the UCLA Film and Television Archive, enabling the film to play at festivals and historic theaters around the country. This has greatly improved the reputation of the film. Flicker Alley released the film on Blu-ray on October 6, 2020.

A print of Chicago also survives at the Gosfilmofond Russian State Archives.

Adaptations
The plot was adapted to stage in 1975 with music and lyrics by John Kander and Fred Ebb. It was a critical and commercial success, and was made into a musical film in 2002, starring Renée Zellweger as Roxie, Catherine Zeta-Jones as fellow murderess Velma Kelly, Richard Gere as Billy Flynn, Queen Latifah as Mama Morton, and John C. Reilly as Amos. The film was also a hit and won the Academy Award for Best Picture in 2003.

See also
 Roxie Hart (1942)
 Chicago (musical)
 Chicago (2002)

References

External links
 
 

Stills at moviessilently.com

1927 films
1920s crime comedy-drama films
American black-and-white films
American crime comedy-drama films
American silent feature films
American films based on plays
Films set in Chicago
Films directed by Frank Urson
Pathé Exchange films
1920s English-language films
1920s American films
Silent American comedy-drama films
Silent crime films